Football Club Shakhter, commonly referred to as FC Shakhter Karagandy (Russian: Караганда/Karaganda), is a professional football club based in Karagandy, Kazakhstan. They have been members of the Kazakhstan Premier League since its foundation in 1992.

History
After reaching third place in 1995 and 2007, their first championship was won in 2011.
Before this they were one of the leading Kazakh teams in the football of the Soviet Union.

On 19 September 2008, Shakhter and Vostok were disqualified from the Kazakhstan Premier League for playing a fixed match, club coaches and management involved were banned from football for 60 months. On 2 October 2008, the FFK revisited their decisions. Shakhter were deducted nine points, Vostok were immediately expelled from the competition. The result of the game in question has been cancelled and all remaining Vostok games will be counted as won by 3–0 for their opponents.

On 20 August 2013, Shakhter defeated Scottish champions Celtic by 2–0 at home in 2013–14 UEFA Champions League play-off round first leg. However, Celtic won the return leg by 3–0 and Shakhter dropped into the Europa League – the first time a Kazakh club has progressed to the group stage of a European competition. Shakhter were eliminated from the Europa League by finishing fourth in a group containing PAOK, Maccabi Haifa and AZ.

On 9 January 2018, Uladzimir Zhuravel was appointed as Shakhter Karagandy's new manager. Zhuravel resigned as manager on 3 July 2018, with Andrei Finonchenko taking charge in a temporary manner. On 18 July 2018, Nikolay Kostov was confirmed as Shakhter Karagandy's new manager. On 30 December 2019, Vyacheslav Hroznyi was announced as the new manager of Shakhter Karagandy, leaving on 17 June 2020 by mutual consent. The following day, 18 June 2020, Konstantin Gorovenka was announced as the clubs new manager. After Konstantin Gorovenka left the club at the end of the 2020 season, Shakhter Karagandy announced Ali Aliyev as their new manager on 20 January 2021. Less than three months later, and after suffering 5 defeats in 6 games, Aliyev resigned from his position on 10 April 2021 with Andrei Finonchenko being appoint as the clubs Caretaker Manager. Six days later, 16 April 2021, Shakhter Karagandy announced Magomed Adiyev as their new Head Coach. On 5 May 2022, Adiyev was appointed as manager of the Kazakhstan national team, with Vakhid Masudov returning as his replacement on 28 June 2022 after a period where Konstantin Emeljanov was acting head coach.

Domestic history

European history

Notes
 1R: First round
 1Q: First qualifying round
 2Q: Second qualifying round
 3Q: Third qualifying round
 PO: Play-off round

Honours
Kazakhstan Premier League: 2
2011, 2012

Kazakhstan Cup: 1
2013

Kazakhstan Super Cup: 1
2013

Soviet First League: 1
1962

Current squad

Managers
 Anatoly Krutikov (1977)
 Lev Burchalkin (1990–1991)
 Vakhid Masudov (2000)
 Sergei Gorokhovodatskiy (2001–July 2003)
 Juha Malinen (2007)
 Revaz Dzodzuashvili (1 Jan 2007 – 1 June 2008)
 Vladimir Cheburin (2009–2010)
 Viktor Kumykov (1 Jan 2011 – Dec 2014)
 Igor Soloshenko (2023)

Information correct as of match played 28 November 2021. Only competitive matches are counted.

Notes:

See also

 Kazakhstani football clubs in European competitions

References

External links

 Official website

 
Football clubs in Kazakhstan
Sport in Karaganda
Association football clubs established in 1958
Mining association football teams
1958 establishments in the Kazakh Soviet Socialist Republic